Charles N. Beecher (May 7, 1806November 2, 1864) was a Michigan politician.

Early life
Beecher was born on May 7, 1806, in Livonia, New York. Beecher moved to Michigan in May 1836.

Career
After arriving to the state in 1836, Beecher settled a farm in Genesee, Michigan. Beecher lived on farm until 1854. On November 5, 1850, Beecher was elected to the Michigan House of Representatives where he represented the Genesee County district from February 5, 1851, to December 31, 1852. Sometime after this term in the legislature, Beecher switched from being a Whig to a Republican. On November 4, 1856, Beecher was elected to the Michigan House of Representatives where he represented the Genesee County 1st district from January 7, 1857, to December 31, 1858. During unspecified years of his life, Beecher has served as a postmaster for seventeen years, a county commissioner for two years, and an associate county judge.

Death
In 1854, Beecher moved to Flint, Michigan. Beecher died in Flint on November 2, 1864.

References

1806 births
County commissioners in Michigan
Farmers from Michigan
People from Livonia, New York
Politicians from Flint, Michigan
Members of the Michigan House of Representatives
Michigan postmasters
Michigan Republicans
Michigan Whigs
19th-century American politicians
19th-century American judges
1864 deaths